The Journal of Posthuman Studies is a biannual peer-reviewed academic journal published by the Penn State University Press and hosted by the Ewha Institute for the Humanities. Established in 2017, the journal seeks to address questions such as what it is to be human in this age of technological, scientific, cultural, and social evolution. Drawing on theory from critical posthumanism and transhumanism, the journal encourages constructive and critical dialogue through research articles, discussion papers, and forums.

References

External links

Biannual journals
English-language_journals
Publications_established_in_2017
Penn State University Press academic journals